Thomas Letson Pardo (November 21, 1840 – 1925) was an Ontario farmer, manufacturer and political figure. He represented Kent West in the Legislative Assembly of Ontario from 1894 to 1902 as a Liberal-Patrons of Industry and then Liberal member.

He was born at Cedar Springs, Upper Canada, the son of Thomas Pardo. Pardo was in British Columbia from 1862 to 1865, possibly in search of gold. After his return, in 1866, he married Ellen Jane Price. He operated a sawmill in partnership with his brothers, later becoming sole owner, and also manufactured barrel staves and operated gristmills at Blenheim. Pardo served on the council for Harwich Township, also serving as reeve. He was a Freemason and a member of the Ancient Order of United Workmen.

External links 
The Canadian parliamentary companion, 1897 JA Gemmill

Commemorative biographical record of the county of Kent (1904)

1840 births
1925 deaths
Ontario Liberal Party MPPs
Canadian Methodists
Ontario Patrons of Industry MPPs